Watertown Charter Township is a charter township of Clinton County in the U.S. state of Michigan. The population was 4,836 in the 2010 census, which was an increase from 4,162 at the 2000 census.

Communities
Wacousta is a small unincorporated community and census-designated place within the township.

Geography

Demographics

As of the census of 2000, there were 4,162 people, 1,469 households, and 1,213 families residing in the township. The racial makeup of the township was 96.11% White, 0.70% African American, 0.19% Native American, 0.77% Asian, 0.12% Pacific Islander, 1.15% from other races, and 0.96% from two or more races. Hispanic or Latino of any race were 2.40% of the population.

There were 1,469 households, out of which 38.7% had children under the age of 18 living with them, 74.1% were married couples living together, 6.3% had a female householder with no husband present, and 17.4% were non-families. 14.6% of all households were made up of individuals, and 5.3% had someone living alone who was 65 years of age or older.  The average household size was 2.81 and the average family size was 3.11.

In the township the population was spread out, with 27.5% under the age of 18, 6.6% from 18 to 24, 27.4% from 25 to 44, 30.4% from 45 to 64, and 8.2% who were 65 years of age or older.  The median age was 39 years. For every 100 females, there were 102.5 males.  For every 100 females age 18 and over, there were 96.6 males.

The median income for a household in the township was $67,034, and the median income for a family was $71,354. Males had a median income of $50,536 versus $31,875 for females. The per capita income for the township was $26,631.  About 1.1% of families and 2.2% of the population were below the poverty line, including 2.4% of those under age 18 and none of those age 65 or over.

References

External links
 Official website

Townships in Clinton County, Michigan
Charter townships in Michigan
Lansing–East Lansing metropolitan area
Populated places established in 1837
1837 establishments in Michigan